S.K.Sajeesh (Malayalam: സ് . കെ സജീഷ് )  (born 15 March 1982) is an Indian politician from the state of Kerala. He is a member of the Communist Party of India (Marxist) political party. He is currently working as Treasurer , Kerala State Committee of the Democratic Youth Federation of India (DYFI)

Early life
Sk Sajeesh was born in Perambra, Kozhikode. He did his schooling at Perambra high school and subsequently completed his pre-degree from CKG Memorial Government College, Perambra. He completed B.com from R. Shankar Memorial Arts and Science College
(RSM SNDP Yogam College, Koyilandy), He studied LL.B from Government Law College, Kozhikode.

Political career
S.K.Sajeesh entered into politics as a  Students' Federation of India (SFI) activist during his school days. He was part of the leadership of SFI from school to the state level.  He was the former chairman of the Calicut University Union.
In 2009 SK Sajeesh was elected as State Vice President of SFI Kerala Chapter. He written the lyrics of the famous theme song of the 20th CPIM Party Congress at Kozhikode. Later he moved onto DYFI. he was the District President of DYFI Kozhikode 2016–2018.At present he is the Treasurer of Dyfi kerala state Committee . He has led various furious struggles against different corrupted UDF governments being in the leadership of SFI and DYFI.

Positions held
SFI Perambra Unit Secretary
SFI Perambra Area Secretary
SFI Koyilandi Area Secretary
SFI Onchiyum Area Secretary
SN College Union Chairman
SFI Kozhikode District Secretary 2005-10
SFI wayanad District In charge
Kozhikode Law College Union UUC
Calicut University Union councilor
Calicut University Union Chairman 2008
Calicut University Syndicate Member
SFI State Vice President 2009
CPIM Perambra Area Committee Member
DYFI State Committee Member
DYFI State Secretariat Member
DYFI Kozhikode District President 2016-2018
Kerala Tourism Promotion Council Executive member 2017
DYFI STATE CENTER MEMBER 2018

TREASURER, DYFI KERALA STATE COMMITTEE 2018
 Central Committee member 2019, DYFI India

References

http://m.thehindu.com/news/cities/kozhikode/dyfi-waves-black-flags-at-minister/article7335756.ece
http://www.thehindu.com/todays-paper/tp-national/tp-kerala/sk-sajeesh-elected-calicut-university-union-chairman/article1312226.ece
https://www.facebook.com/SK-Sajeesh-1265836083561068/
http://www.dyfi.in/publications
http://youtube.com/watch?v=tyR7FVSgNgk
http://keralasfi.org/history
https://m.facebook.com/sk.sajeesh?__xt__=12.%7B%22unit_id_click_type%22%3A%22graph_search_results_item_in_module_tapped%22%2C%22click_type%22%3A%22result%22%2C%22module_id%22%3A0%2C%22result_id%22%3A100000239367935%2C%22sid%22%3A%22e9fe2b348d69569a2283dd1d5685a6ef%22%2C%22module_role%22%3A%22NONE%22%2C%22unit_id%22%3A%22browse_rl%3Aee350cec8f9156d35ffc848cc292b0c5%3Ac1%22%2C%22browse_result_type%22%3A%22browse_type_user%22%2C%22unit_id_result_id%22%3A100000239367935%2C%22module_result_position%22%3A0%7D

1982 births
Living people
Communist Party of India (Marxist) politicians from Kerala
Politicians from Kozhikode
21st-century Indian politicians